Jahongir Khodjamov (born 24 May 1996) is a Kazakhstani professional footballer.

References

External links 
 
 

1996 births
Living people
Kazakhstani footballers
Kazakhstani expatriate footballers
Expatriate footballers in Uzbekistan
Expatriate footballers in Belarus
Association football midfielders
FC Bunyodkor players
FC Energetik-BGU Minsk players
FC Kyran players